Diemodynerus is an Australasian genus of potter wasps. It contains the following species:

 Diemodynerus corvinus Borsato, 2005
 Diemodynerus decipiens (Saussure, 1867)
 Diemodynerus didjeridus Borsato, 2005
 Diemodynerus diemensis (Saussure, 1853)
 Diemodynerus nigroflavus Borsato, 2005
 Diemodynerus pseudacarodynerus Giordani Soika, 1961
 Diemodynerus saucius (Saussure, 1856)
 Diemodynerus tinypilpus Borsato, 2005

References

Potter wasps